Ahmadi School for the Visually Challenged (formerly Ahmadi Blind School) is a constituent school of the Aligarh Muslim University catering the visually challenged students. It also gives vocational training such as typing, armature winding, Turner's course, instrumental and vocal music, weaving of handlooms, and cane and bamboo work.

Ahmadi School provides free lodging, food and clothing. The school aims to provide various sports facilities such as swimming, skating and cricket to cater to the physical rejuvenation of students.

History 
Founded by Sahibzada Aftab Ahmad Khan specially for Visually Challenged Student. The school is mainly residential with facilities of free boarding and lodging.

References

Notes

Schools for the blind in India
Educational institutions established in 1927
1927 establishments in India
Aligarh Muslim University